Yaron Finkelman (born 1975) is an Israeli brigadier general who commands the 98th Paratroopers Division of Israel Defense Forces.

Military service
Finkelman was drafted into the IDF in 1993 and did most of his military service in the paratroopers Brigade. He served as a soldier and squad leader in the 500th Brigade Reconnaissance company. In 1996 he became an infantry officer after completing officer candidate school and return to the Brigade. Finkelman led the Brigade's Reconnaissance company in counter-guerrilla operations in South Lebanon. Afterwards he served as an Executive officer in Maglan special forces unit and in 890 "Efe" (Echis) paratroop battalion in counter-terror operations in the Second Intifada. In 2006 Lebanon War he served as Gen. Dan Halutz's aide-de-camp. Later on he commanded the 35th paratroopers Brigade's reconnaissance battalion in counter-terror operations in the Gaza Strip. On November 4, 2008, he led his paratroopers in Operation Double Challenge, a military incursion into a residential area of Dayr al-Balah in central Gaza, that resulted in six militants killed and the destruction of a tunnel concealed within a building 300 meters from the fence on the Gaza Strip border. Finkelman continued and led his paratroopers battalion during the Operation Cast Lead.

He commanded a reserve Paratrooper Brigade during Operation Pillar of Defense and a Regional Brigade in the Gaza Division during Operation Protective Edge. In 2015 he was appointed commander of the Givati Brigade. In 2017 he was promoted to Brigadier general and was given command of the 98th Paratroopers Division.

References

1975 births
Israeli generals
Living people
Israeli Jews
Israeli military personnel